Chatham Central was the terminus of the Chatham Extension from Strood serving the towns of Chatham and Rochester.

The station was opened by the South Eastern Railway which merged with the London, Chatham and Dover Railway to form the South Eastern and Chatham Railway in 1899. After the merger the SE & CR deemed that the Chatham Extension was an unnecessary duplication of the line and stations that it inherited from the LC & DR, and therefore the Extension and its stations, including Chatham Central, was closed in 1911.

Apart from the present railway bridge (part of Rochester Bridge), no trace of the station or the Chatham Extension is evident today.
Houses on Doust Way have been built over the site of the station.

References

Disused railway stations in Kent
Former South Eastern Railway (UK) stations
Railway stations in Great Britain opened in 1892
Railway stations in Great Britain closed in 1911
Chatham, Kent
1892 establishments in England
1911 disestablishments in England